The 50th Infantry Division was a formation of the Prussian Army as part of the Imperial German Army during World War I. The division was formed on March 10, 1915 from units taken from other divisions or newly raised.  Its infantry core was from Westphalia: the 39th Lower Rhine Fusilier Regiment, taken from the 14th Reserve Division, the 53rd Westphalian Infantry Regiment, taken from the 14th Infantry Division, and the 158th Lorraine Infantry Regiment, taken from the 13th Infantry Division.

The division saw extensive action in the Battle of Verdun in 1916, especially in the fight for Fort Vaux. The division fought in the Second Battle of the Aisne, also called the Third Battle of Champagne and referred to in German sources as the Dual Battle of Aisne-Champagne. In 1918, it was involved in the German spring offensive, called the Great Battle in France or the Kaiser Battle It was rated by Allied intelligence in 1917 and 1918 as a first class assault division.

Order of battle on March 10, 1915
 100. Infanterie-Brigade
 Niederrheinisches Füsilier-Regiment Nr. 39
 5. Westfälisches Infanterie-Regiment Nr. 53
 7. Lothringisches Infanterie-Regiment Nr. 158
 Radfahrer-Kompanie Nr. 50
 50.Feldartillerie-Brigade
 Feldartillerie-Regiment Nr. 99
 Feldartillerie-Regiment Nr. 100
 Fußartillerie-Bataillon Nr. 50
 Pionier-Kompanie Nr. 99
 Pionier-Kompanie Nr. 100

Late World War I organization
The division underwent comparatively fewer organizational changes during the course of the war than most other divisions.  The 50th Infantry Division's order of battle on February 22, 1918 was as follows:
 100. Infanterie-Brigade
 Niederrheinisches Füsilier-Regiment Nr. 39
 5. Westfälisches Infanterie-Regiment Nr. 53
 7. Lothringisches Infanterie-Regiment Nr. 158
 MG-Scharfschützen-Abteilung Nr. 36
 1.Eskadron/Ulanen-Regiment Hennigs von Treffenfeld (Altmärkisches) Nr. 16
 Artillerie-Kommandeur 50
 Feldartillerie-Regiment Nr. 99
 Fußartillerie-Bataillon Nr. 95
 Stab Pionier-Bataillon Nr. 50
 Pionier-Kompanie Nr. 99
 Pionier-Kompanie Nr. 100
 Minenwerfer-Kompanie Nr. 50
 Divisions-Nachrichten-Kommandeur 50

References
 50. Infanterie-Division - Der erste Weltkrieg
 Hermann Cron et al., Ruhmeshalle unserer alten Armee (Berlin, 1935)
 Hermann Cron, Geschichte des deutschen Heeres im Weltkriege 1914-1918 (Berlin, 1937)
 Histories of Two Hundred and Fifty-One Divisions of the German Army which Participated in the War (1914-1918), compiled from records of Intelligence section of the General Staff, American Expeditionary Forces, at General Headquarters, Chaumont, France 1919, (1920)

Notes

Military units and formations established in 1915
1915 establishments in Germany
Infantry divisions of Germany in World War I
Military units and formations disestablished in 1919